{{DISPLAYTITLE:C17H23N3O}}
The molecular formula C17H23N3O may refer to:

 Mepyramine, a first generation antihistamine
 Piperylone, a pyrazolone with analgesic, anti-inflammatory, and antipyretic properties
 PSN-375,963, a selective ligand